The Group of Six Artists was an artist collective founded in 1975 by the Croatian artists Mladen, Sven Stilinović, Fedor Vučemilović, Boris Demur, Vlado Martek and Željko Jerman in Zagreb, Croatia. 

In defiance of restrictions set by local art institutions, they performed their pieces in open air spaces using objects such as sun loungers and urban projectors (projecting images onto buildings). They also exhibited in city squares. The "exhibition-actions" were shown in Croatia and abroad, including the municipal bath on the Sava River in the Upper Town Zagreb centre, in Sopot in New Zagreb in the main square in Zagreb (1975), on the beach in Mošćenička Draga (1976), in Venice (1978) and in Belgrade (1976-1978). 

These exhibitions would usually last a day and were often meant to provoke. Between 1975 and 1979, the Group of Six Artists performed and documented more than 20 pieces. The Group of Six Artists were influenced by their predecessors, the Gorgona Group. Overall, their aim was to provide a different perspective on life and art, expressing themselves freely.

In addition to their exhibition-actions, the Group of Six Artists launched the self-published magazine MAJ/75, printed in the studio of Vlasta Delimar and Željko Jerman. Eighteen issues of the magazine were printed between 1978 and 1984, and the publication became an additional alternative exhibition space for the Group of Six Artists and other eastern European creatives, including Vlasta Delimar, Tomislav Gotovac, Sanja Iveković, Mangelos, Balint Szombathy, Raša Todosijević and Goran Trbuljak.

Exhibition and actions
The group exhibited regularly in Croatia.
1979: former Republic Square, Zagreb, Croatia (together with RZU Podrum)
1979: Faculty of Economy, Zagreb, Croatia
1979: Studentski centar, Zagreb, Croatia (with RZU Podrum)
1978: Life Art, Galerija SKC, Belgrade, Serbia
1978: Voćarska 5, Zagreb, Croatia
1978: former Republic Square, Zagreb, Croatia
1977: Studentski centar, Zagreb, Croatia
1977: Neboder passage, Zagreb, Croatia
1977: Galerija SKC, Belgrade, Serbia
1975–77: Contemporary Art Gallery (Cefft), Zagreb, Croatia
1977: Faculty of Philosophy, Belgrade, Serbia
1977: Faculty of Philosophy, Zagreb, Croatia
1976: beach in Mošćenička Draga, Croatia
1976: strolling through Zagreb, Croatia
1976: 5 April Meetings, Belgrade, Serbia
1975: the public baths on the river Sava, Zagreb, Croatia
1975: Sopot, Zagreb, Croatia
1975: Jesuit Square, Zagreb, Croatia

References

External links
 MAJ/75 Covers
 Documentary Film G6-Grupa šestorice autora Directed by Gordana Brzović 
Procesualnost, događajnost, relacionalnost i otvorenost 

Croatian art
1970s in Croatia
Arts organizations established in 1975
Croatian artist groups and collectives